Clennell is a small village and as Clennel, a former civil parish, now in the parish of Alwinton, in Northumberland, England. In 1951 the parish had a population of 37.

Governance 
Clennell is in the parliamentary constituency of Berwick-upon-Tweed. Clennell was formerly a township in Alwinton parish, from 1866 Clennel was a civil parish in its own right until it was abolished on 1 April 1955 and merged with Biddlestone.

See also
Clennell Hall

References

External links 

Villages in Northumberland
Clennel
Alwinton